Cobalt(II) hydroxide or cobaltous hydroxide is the inorganic compound with the formula , consisting of divalent cobalt cations  and hydroxide anions . The pure compound, often called the "beta form" (β-) is a pink solid insoluble in water.

The name is also applied to a related compound, often called "alpha" or "blue" form (α-), which incorporates other anions in its molecular structure.  This compound is blue and rather unstable.

Cobalt(II) hydroxide is most used as a drying agent for paints, varnishes, and inks, in the preparation of other cobalt compounds, as a catalyst and in the manufacture of battery electrodes.

Preparation
Cobalt(II) hydroxide precipitates as a solid when an alkali metal hydroxide is added to an aqueous solution of Co2+ salt.  For example,
Co2+  + 2 NaOH   →   Co(OH)2  +  2 Na+

The compound can be prepared by reacting cobalt(II) nitrate in water with a solution of triethylamine  as both the base and a complexing agent. It can also be prepared by elecrolysis of a solution of cobalt nitrate with a platinum cathode.

Reactions
Cobalt(II) hydroxide decomposes to cobalt(II) oxide at 168 °C under vacuum and is oxidized by air. The thermal decomposition product in air above 300 °C is Co3O4.

Like iron(II) hydroxide, cobalt(II) hydroxide is a basic hydroxide, and reacts with acids to form cobalt(II) salts.  It also reacts with strong bases to form solutions with dark blue cobaltate(II) anions, [Co(OH)4]2− and [Co(OH)6]4−.

Structure
The pure (β) form of cobalt(II) hydroxide has the brucite crystal structure.  As such, the anion and cation packing are like those in cadmium iodide, in which the cobalt(II) cations have octahedral molecular geometry.

The beta form can be obtained as platelets with partial hexagonal geometry, 100-300 nm wide and 5-10 nm thick.

Alpha form
The so-called "alpha form" (α-Co(OH)2) is not a polymorph of the pure (β) form, but rather a more complex compound in which hydroxide-cobalt-hydroxide layers have a residual positive charge and alternate with layers of other anions such as nitrate, carbonate, chloride, etc. (the hydrotalcite structure).  It is usually obtained as a blue precipitate when a base like sodium hydroxide is added to a solution of a cobalt(II) salt.  The precipitate slowly converts to the beta form.

Nanotubes
Cobalt hydroxide can be obtained in the form of nanotubes, which may be of interest in nanotechnology and materials science.

References

Cobalt(II) compounds
Hydroxides